Daniela Valeska Seguel Carvajal, (born 15 November 1992), is a Chilean tennis player. She has won 16 singles and 28 doubles titles on the ITF Women's Circuit. On 28 May 2018, she reached her best singles ranking of world No. 162, weeks after reaching quarterfinals on the Copa Colsanitas, her best result on a WTA Tour tournament yet. Seguel's first-round win over Nicole Gibbs was the first professional match won by a Chilean female tennis player since 1980. On 7 July 2014, she peaked at No. 110 in the WTA doubles rankings.

Playing for Chile Fed Cup team, Seguel has a win-loss record of 21–18 in Fed Cup competitions.

Junior career
In 2006, her debut on the ITF Junior Circuit came at the age of 13. She played her first tournament at the first Open Junior International Chile, in May. There, she reached the quarterfinals, before losing to Argentinian player Ornella Caron, in straight sets.
In 2007, she won her first singles title at the second Junior Open Chile, in October.

In 2008, she reached one final, at the Copa Gobierno Bolivariano de Carabobo in Valencia, Venezuela.
In 2009, she won the Vina Junior Open, by defeating her compatriot Cecilia Costa Melgar in the final, in straight sets.

In 2010, she played her last junior tournament, at the 27th Copa Gerdau in Porto Alegre, Brazil, where she was stopped in the second round by Slovak player Jana Čepelová.

ITF Circuit
Seguel made her debut at the professional level in 2007, at a $10k tournament in Santiago, Chile. In singles, she lost in the first round to Vivian Segnini. In July 2010, she reached her first ITF singles final in La Paz, Bolivia. She lost the final in straight sets to Colombian player Karen Castiblanco. In November 2010, she won her first ITF title at a $10k in Concepción, Chile, alongside compatriot Fernanda Brito. In singles, she won her first title in April 2011, at a $10k event in Córdoba, Argentina.

So far, her biggest ITF title in singles came at the Barcelona Women World Winner, in June 2017.

Grand Slam performance timeline

Singles

WTA career finals

Doubles: 1 (runner–up)

ITF Circuit finals

Singles: 24 (16 titles, 8 runner–ups)

Doubles: 45 (28 titles, 17 runner–ups)

Notes

References

External links

 
 
 

1992 births
Living people
Tennis players from Santiago
Chilean female tennis players
Tennis players at the 2015 Pan American Games
Tennis players at the 2011 Pan American Games
Pan American Games competitors for Chile
South American Games gold medalists for Chile
South American Games silver medalists for Chile
South American Games medalists in tennis
Competitors at the 2018 South American Games
Tennis players at the 2019 Pan American Games
Competitors at the 2010 South American Games
21st-century Chilean women